Kapell is a surname. Notable people with the surname include:

 Matthew Kapell (born 1969), American historian and anthropologist
 William Kapell (1922–1953), American pianist and recording artist

See also
 Kapel (disambiguation)
 Kappel (disambiguation)